Copán Ruinas Airport  is a newly completed airport serving the town of Copán Ruinas in Honduras.

The airport was opened in 2015, and is expected to provide easier tourist access to the Mayan ruins at Copán. A second construction phase is planned that will allow aircraft with up to 100 passengers to land.

There are low hills in all quadrants.

See also

Transport in Honduras
List of airports in Honduras

References

External links
 FallingRain - Copán Ruinas
 OpenStreetMap - Copán Ruinas
 OurAirports - Copán Ruinas
 

Airports in Honduras